Adilia Castillo (1933-2014) was a Venezuelan actress, composer and singer. She specialised in musica llanera, the folk music of the plains of Venezuela.

Discography 

El Llano Veneolan En La Voz de ADILIA CASTILLO. Description - Seleciones De Musica Venezolana - Canta "La Novia Del Llano" LP

Side 1
 Mi Recuerdo - Pasaje - Adila Castillo
 Nuestro Amor - Pasaje - Adilia Castillo
 Instrumenatal - Pasaje - Foklore Venezolano
 Flora Sabanera - Pasaje - Jose Romero
 Amor Inutile - Isabelita Sanchez
 Llano Adentro - Jose Romero

Side 2 
 Lejos de Tre - Pasaje - M. Adilia Castillo, L.V.Caruci
 Mi Lamento - Pasaje - Adilai Castillo
 Istrumental - M. Jose Romero
 Saucelito - Pasaje - Folklore Veneolano
 Morena Linda - Adilia Castillo
 El Lanero - M. Anonimo L. Cosme Carvajal
 Pressed for "Comercial Llanero" Palmaa Miracielos 55 - Caracas

References 

1933 births
2014 deaths
Venezuelan actresses
Venezuelan composers
20th-century Venezuelan women singers